"Mother Earth" is a science fiction novella by American writer Isaac Asimov. It was written from September 1 to October 10, 1948, and published in the May 1949 issue of Astounding Science Fiction. It was republished in Asimov's 1972 short story collection The Early Asimov.

Context within Asimov's universe
No individual robots appear, but positronic robots are part of the background. With fifty Spacer worlds led by Aurora, this tale seems to bridge the gap between the early robot stories and The Caves of Steel. Asimov himself is ambiguous about the link, saying:

The term "Galactic Empire" appears at the end of the novel. This could indicate a possible link to the Empire Series. The first Empire novel, Pebble in the Sky, was written in 1947, the year before "Mother Earth".

Themes
A major theme of the story is the way in which the Spacers have closed their thinly populated worlds to Earth's crowded inhabitants. This was not an abstraction to Isaac Asimov, who was born in the village of Petrovichi in Russia. When he was three, his parents were able to emigrate to the United States, shortly before severe restrictions were placed on the immigration of Russian and East European Jews.  He did not forget the link, and in fact remained fluent in Yiddish as well as English.

Plot summary

Earth faces a confrontation with its colonies, the "Outer Worlds." A historian looks back and sees the problem beginning a century and a half earlier, when Aurora got permission to "introduce positronic robots into their community life." No date is given, but fifty years before the story starts, the Outer Worlds established an immigration quota against incoming Terran citizens. The balance of power then tipped. Now war appears likely, and there are rumors that Earth has developed an unknown weapon, code-named the "Pacific Project."

On Aurora, there is also concern, but the Aurorans decide that the threat cannot be serious. They use authoritarian methods to suppress Ion Mereanu and his Conservatives, who wish to help Earth. They then call a gathering on Hesperus, one of the Outer Worlds, to unite them against Earth.

There is some rivalry from two other planets, Rhea and Tethys. "All three planets were identically racist, identically exclusivist. Their views on Earth were similar, and completely compatible... But Aurora was the oldest of the Outer Worlds, the most advanced, the strongest militarily... Rhea and Tethys served as a focal point for those who did not recognize Auroran leadership." But Earth unexpectedly sends a threatening message to all of the worlds, uniting them against Earth.

War follows (later termed the "Three-Week War" by historians), and Earth swiftly loses. Trade is ended—the Outer Worlds have no need of Earth's exports, which are mostly agricultural. Earthmen are not allowed to journey beyond the Solar System.

The war was planned in the expectation of defeat—that was what the "Pacific Project" was all about. This is in part to force Earth to make necessary reforms including the use of robots, hydroponic agriculture, and population control. But the Outer Worlds will also weaken and split, because their worlds are biologically ill-suited to long-term human habitation. Several consequences for Earth are predicted from the entire conflict:

References

External links
 
 "Mother Earth" on the Internet Archive

Short stories by Isaac Asimov
1949 short stories
Works originally published in Analog Science Fiction and Fact